The 1949 All-Ireland Senior Hurling Championship Final was the 62nd All-Ireland Final and the culmination of the 1949 All-Ireland Senior Hurling Championship, an inter-county hurling tournament for the top teams in Ireland. The match was held at Croke Park, Dublin, on 4 September 1949, between Tipperary and Laois. The Leinster champions lost to their Munster opponents on a score line of 3-11 to 0-3.

Laois trailed 1-5 to 0-3 at half time but failed to score again in the second half.

Match details

References
 
 
 

All-Ireland Senior Hurling Championship Final
All-Ireland Senior Hurling Championship Final, 1949
All-Ireland Senior Hurling Championship Final
All-Ireland Senior Hurling Championship Finals
Laois county hurling team matches
Tipperary county hurling team matches